Metropolitan city may refer to:

 Metropolitan cities of Italy, administrative divisions of Italy covering the main city and its metropolitan area 
 Metropolitan cities of Australia, statistical divisions of Australia covering the main city and its metropolitan area, defined by Australian Bureau of Statistics
 Metropolitan municipalities in Turkey, districts includes a corresponding district municipality in Turkey
 Metropolitan municipalities in South Africa,  municipalities which executes all the functions of local government for a city or conurbation in South Africa
 Metropolitan Municipality of Lima, government entity of Lima, Peru
 Metropolis GZM, metropolitan city-unit in Poland

See also 
 Metropolitan municipality
 Metropolis